King Of... is a British comedy panel show that aired on Channel 4 from 17 June to 8 July 2011 and hosted by Claudia Winkleman. The show featured two celebrity guests per episode and a studio audience. The guests discussed what is the 'king of' various categories.

Episodes

External links

@c4kingof Twitter

2011 British television series debuts
2011 British television series endings
2010s British comedy television series
2010s British television talk shows
Channel 4 comedy
English-language television shows
Television series by Big Talk Productions